Spain competed at the 1968 Summer Olympics in Mexico City, Mexico. 122 competitors, 120 men and 2 women, took part in 50 events in 12 sports.

Athletics

Basketball

Boxing

Canoeing

Cycling

Seven cyclists represented Spain in 1968.

Individual road race
 José Gómez
 Luis Zubero
 Miguel Lasa
 Agustín Tamames

Team time trial
 Nemesio Jiménez
 José Gómez
 José González
 Miguel Lasa

Individual pursuit
 Daniel Yuste

Football

Hockey

Rowing

Sailing

Shooting

Twelve shooters, all men, represented Spain in 1968.
Open

Swimming

Water polo

Men's Team Competition
Preliminary Round (Group A)
 Lost to West Germany (3:5)
 Lost to United States (7:10)
 Lost to Hungary (1:7)
 Lost to Soviet Union (0:5)
 Tied with Brazil (6:6)
 Lost to Cuba (3:4)

Classification Matches
9th/12th place: Defeated Japan (5:0)
9th/10th place: Defeated West Germany (7:5) → Ninth place

Team Roster
Agustin Codera
Fermin Mas
Jorge Borell
José Padros
Juan Jane
Juan Rubio
Luis Bestit
Luis Meya
Manuel Ibern
Santiago Zubicoa
Vicente Brugat

References

External links
 Spanish Olympic Committee
 Official Olympic Reports

Nations at the 1968 Summer Olympics
1968
Oly